The article below lists top hotels in Chennai, Tamil Nadu, India

Background
Chennai is the third most visited city in India by foreigners, after New Delhi and Mumbai. In 2013, Chennai attracted 3,581,200 foreign tourists. The city was visited by 3,857,900 tourists in 2014 and 4,243,700 tourists in 2015. Visitors to heritage sites in Kanchipuram and Mahabalipuram and medical tourists make up the largest number of visitors to the city, chiefly from the United States, the United Kingdom, Sri Lanka, Malaysia and Singapore. In 2011, Chennai was ranked 41st in global top 100 city destination ranking, with 3,174,500 tourists, a 14 percent increase from 2010, and up from 2,059,900 tourists in 2009. In 2012, Chennai served 3,535,200 foreign tourists, ranking as 38th most visited city in the world and most visited city in India.

, the city had 21 luxury hotels in the five-star category, with over 4,500 rooms in the inventory. As of 2018, the collective luxury room inventory across four and five-star categories was around 7,000. About 85 percent of the room demand in Chennai comes from business travellers. Demand in the central business district comes mainly from BFSI and PSU companies, while the demand in the southern side of the city (Old Mahabalipuram Road) comes from information technology (IT)/IT-enabled services (ITeS) companies. Proximity to electronics and the auto industry players in and around the Sriperumbudur area in the west side of the city creates demand for hotels near the Chennai airport area among business travellers.

Chennai offers the world’s most affordable five-star hotel rooms. According to a 2021 survey by LuxuryHotel.com, it is the least expensive city for a five-star stay in the world, with a baseline for a five-star room being  3,530 (34 UK pounds). It ranks 35th in the world in the percentage of five-star hotels (4.21%, with 33 five-stars among 784 hotels in the city).

List of functioning hotels

See also
 List of hotels in India
 Tourism in Chennai

References

 
Hotels
Chennai
Chennai, Hotels
Hotels in Chennai